Frederick Graver (8 September 1897 – 1950) was an English footballer who played as an inside right or centre forward. He appeared in the Football League for Grimsby Town, although he played more for their reserve team in the Midland League, Leeds United and Southend United. Graver also played for Burnhope Institute and for North-Eastern League clubs Darlington, for whom he scored 14 league goals and 2 in the FA Cup, Shildon Athletic, West Stanley, for whom he scored 41 league goals, and Wallsend.

His son Andy remains, Lincoln City's all-time top scorer.

References

1897 births
1950 deaths
People from Lanchester, County Durham
Footballers from County Durham
English footballers
Association football forwards
Darlington F.C. players
Shildon A.F.C. players
Grimsby Town F.C. players
West Stanley F.C. players
Place of death missing
Leeds United F.C. players
Southend United F.C. players
Wallsend F.C. players
English Football League players
Midland Football League players